This is a list of notable Nigerian bloggers.

Chude Jideonwo
Linda Ikeji
Japheth J. Omojuwa
Judith Audu
Kenneth Uwadi
Kemi Omololu-Olunloyo
Kola Tubosun
Luvvie Ajayi
Myne Whitman
Noble Igwe
Tolu Ogunlesi
Tosin Ajibade
Uche Eze
Seun Osewa
Adebola Williams

References 

Nigerian bloggers
Bloggers